Ioannis Marokos (born 22 October 1999) is a Greek rower. Among with Ninos Nikolaidis, he won a silver medal for Greece, at the 2018 Mediterranean Games.

References

Living people
1999 births
Mediterranean Games silver medalists for Greece
Greek male rowers
Mediterranean Games medalists in rowing
Competitors at the 2018 Mediterranean Games
World Rowing Championships medalists for Greece
Rowers from Thessaloniki